The 2005–06 NHL season was the 89th season of operation (88th season of play) of the National Hockey League (NHL). This season succeeded the 2004–05 season which had all of its scheduled games canceled due to a labor dispute with the National Hockey League Players' Association (NHLPA) over the Collective Bargaining Agreement (CBA) between the League and its players.

A mid-season break in February occurred to allow participation of NHL players in the 2006 Winter Olympics in Turin, Italy. Because of the Winter Olympics break, there was no NHL All-Star Game for 2006.

The 2006 Stanley Cup playoffs began on April 21, 2006, and concluded on June 19, with the Carolina Hurricanes defeating the Edmonton Oilers to win their first Stanley Cup, after which the Oilers would miss the postseason ten consecutive times and 12 of their next 13, while the Hurricanes would miss 11 of their next 12.

League business

On July 13, 2005, the NHL, and NHLPA jointly announced that they had tentatively agreed to a new collective bargaining agreement which would allow the resumption of hockey for the 2005–06 season. The agreement was voted on July 21 by NHLPA members, and approved by a nearly 7 to 1 margin. The following day, the NHL's Board of Governors (owners) voted unanimously to approve the new agreement.

A new logo for the NHL was also unveiled, with "NHL" printed in upward-reading letters to project a vibrant, optimistic image, and having silver as the dominant color to pay homage to the Stanley Cup. Also, new Eastern and Western Conference logos were unveiled before the Olympic break, with red as the dominant East color, and blue as the dominant West hue.

American television also had a new look. OLN took over broadcasting rights after ESPN decided not to renew their rights on cable television. The network, owned by Comcast, had Monday and Tuesday night games during the regular season under an exclusivity clause prohibiting local telecasts those nights in the two participating teams' markets. NBC returned as the NHL's over-the-air partner after ABC parted ways following the 2003–04 season. Comcast high-speed cable internet customers could watch at least seven games a week over the Internet as part of the new TV deal.

Rule changes
The league returned with a revamped rulebook, to the point that many refer to "pre-lockout" and "post-lockout" when comparing statistics. The rule experimentation was based on the previous season of play in the AHL, and was based on creating a more exciting game with more scoring opportunities. Furthermore, a new Competition Committee was formed to discuss future rule changes, and players were invited to participate in the discussion.

The league introduced shoot-outs at the end of over-time if the score is tied. The shootout features only three shots per team, and if it is still tied, the shootout becomes sudden death. In preseason games (regardless of the outcome) shootouts were held. Shootouts are only in effect for regular-season games. Playoff games will continue with twenty-minute periods until a sudden-death goal is scored.
The neutral zone becomes smaller by four feet (1.2 m).
All blue and red lines are returned to the traditional width of 12 inches (31 cm). The double-width lines used in the AHL 2004–05 season were abandoned.
If a team ices the puck, it is not allowed to make a line change afterwards.
Linesmen are given more discretion when it comes to waving off icing calls when they are accidentally made as the result of a failed pass attempt.
 The "two-line offside pass" rule was abolished; this rule required a stoppage in play if a pass originating from inside a team's defending zone was completed on the offensive side of the center line, unless the puck crossed the line before the player.
 Players who instigate a fight in the last five minutes of a game will be given a game misconduct penalty plus a one-game suspension. Furthermore, the player's coach will be fined $10,000 (US).
 Goaltender equipment was reduced in size by eleven percent.
All referees are equipped with wireless microphones so they can now announce penalties over the public address system, similar to National Football League (NFL) and Canadian Football League (CFL) referees.
With multiple penalties, only the first will be announced by the referee calling the penalty, with the others being announced by the arena's ice-side PA announcer (in English); penalty announcements will also be relayed in French via the Bell Centre's PA announcer for the Montreal Canadiens.
Any player that shoots the puck over the glass (without deflection) from his own defensive zone will be penalized for delay of game. After the 2006 Olympic break, the rule was modified to read that the puck must cross the glass before crossing the blue line.
After the 2006 Olympic break, all sticks to be used in the shootout will be measured prior to use.

Regular season
In terms of total goals scored during an NHL regular season, the 2005–06 regular season turned out to be the highest-scoring in NHL history, with 7,443 goals scored in 1,230 games. However, the highest-scoring season in terms of goals per game still belonged to the 1992–93 regular season, in which 7,311 goals were scored in only 1,008 games, for an average of 7.25 per game (the average in 2005–06 was 6.05 per game). The record for most shorthanded goals scored in a season, set in 1992–93 and matched in 1993–94 at 312, was broken as 318 shorthanded goals were scored. A total of 117 shutouts were recorded, down from an all-time high of 192 in 2003–04. The higher offensive numbers were largely attributable, among other things, to greater frequency of power plays. In 2003–04, teams had an average of 348 power plays over 82 games. In 2005–06, the average number of power plays per team over 82 games was 480.

The NHL season began on October 5, which marked the first time ever that all 30 teams in the league played a game on the same day. In the first period of each game, all teams wore a jersey with a special patch; the league and players association then auctioned off the jerseys for the benefit of the Red Cross in both the United States and Canada, earmarking the proceeds for Hurricane Katrina victims (the Islanders' ECHL affiliate in Biloxi, Mississippi suspended operations for the 2005–06 and 2006–07 seasons because of this disaster, and the NHL toured ECHL cities with the Stanley Cup to raise additional funds for relief efforts). Jean-Pierre Dumont of the Buffalo Sabres scored the first goal of the regular season, and Daniel Alfredsson and Dany Heatley, of the Ottawa Senators became the first players to score the winning goals for a shootout in NHL history, both scoring against Toronto Maple Leafs goaltender Ed Belfour. Their sticks were subsequently sent to the nearby Hockey Hall of Fame in Toronto.

The All-Star Game, which would have been in Phoenix, did not take place (the city will host the event in a future year as a replacement (if at all)); the league instead took a break in February so that many of its players could participate in the XX Winter Olympic Games in Turin, Italy. The new schedule features more intra-division games in order to promote division rivalries. Consequently, there are whole divisions in the opposite conference that teams never played during the season.

This season saw the much-hyped debuts of (and immediate rivalry between) Sidney Crosby and Alexander Ovechkin. It was only the second time that two rookies had over 100 points in a season (Teemu Selanne and Joe Juneau performed the feat in 1992–93). Ovechkin finished with 106 points, which is third best all-time among NHL rookies. Crosby surpassed teammate Mario Lemieux's 100-point rookie season, finishing with 102 points, currently fifth best all-time.

On November 30, 2005, Joe Thornton was traded from the Boston Bruins to the San Jose Sharks in a four-player deal which sent forwards Marco Sturm and Wayne Primeau and defenceman Brad Stuart to Boston. Thornton went on to win the scoring title and to date has consistently been a top ten League scorer. The Bruins would not make the playoffs until 2008.

On November 26, the New York Rangers and Washington Capitals played the second-longest NHL shootout to date. Rangers defenceman Marek Malik scored the winning goal in the 15th round, pulling the puck between his own legs to defeat Capitals goaltender Olaf Kolzig, giving the Rangers the victory by the final score of 3–2.

Three early-season games had to be rescheduled due to various events. Hurricane Wilma had forced the NHL to reschedule two Florida Panthers home games, in which their game against Ottawa Senators scheduled on October 22 was rescheduled to December 5; the game against the Washington Capitals scheduled for October 29 was moved to December 1. The Nashville Predators–Detroit Red Wings game on November 22 was called off with 7:30 left in the first period after Red Wings defenceman Jiri Fischer suffered a seizure and had to be resuscitated. It was rescheduled to January 23, 2006, with the game starting 1–0 for Nashville as Greg Johnson's goal from the original date was allowed to stand. The game that was originally scheduled for January 23 at Nashville between the two teams was moved to March 30, 2006.

On January 12, the New York Rangers retired the number 11 of long-time captain Mark Messier to the rafters of Madison Square Garden. The Rangers would beat Messier's former team, the Edmonton Oilers, 5–4 in overtime.

On January 16 in Phoenix, Washington Capitals rookie winger Alexander Ovechkin added himself to the league's historical highlight reel by scoring a goal from his back while rolling and sliding past the goal. Ovechkin was checked to the ice by Coyotes defenceman Paul Mara on a breakaway between the Coyotes' faceoff circles, but rolled to his back, reached over his head with his stick and hooked the puck in behind goaltender Brian Boucher.

On January 19, Los Angeles Kings veteran left winger Luc Robitaille scored his 550th, 551st and 552nd goals as a member of the Kings, eclipsing Marcel Dionne's franchise record of 550 goals. The 40-year-old Robitaille retired at season's end.

The season was rocked with scandal in early February when it came to light that Phoenix Coyotes Assistant coach Rick Tocchet was found to be involved in a $1.6 million illegal sports gambling ring with Mafia ties. Apparently, no betting on NHL games was being done, but bets were being placed on college and professional football and college and professional basketball. Although Coyotes Head Coach Wayne Gretzky denied any knowledge or involvement in the ring, initial reports stated that wiretapped phone conversations he had proved that he not only knew about the ring, but was trying to find ways to conceal his wife's involvement in it. He was later cleared of these accusations, but long-term implications to his reputation are still unknown. 

On April 15, in the Nashville Predators' 81st game of the season, Nashville goaltender Chris Mason was credited with a goal when the Phoenix Coyotes' Geoff Sanderson put the puck in his own net. Mason was awarded credit for the goal, as he was the last Predator to have touched the puck. It was the ninth regular season goal scored by a goaltender in NHL history. The last goal of the regular season was scored by Kyle Calder of the Chicago Blackhawks in overtime in a 3–2 victory over the St. Louis Blues, which ended the 2005–06 regular season at 10:50 EDT on April 18, 2006.

The Tampa Bay Lightning narrowly avoided becoming the first team since the New Jersey Devils in the 1995–96 season to miss the post-season after winning the Stanley Cup the previous season.

This season also marked the first time since the 1978–79 season that the St. Louis Blues did not qualify for the Stanley Cup playoffs, ending the third-longest NHL post-season appearance streak at 25 seasons. Only the Chicago Blackhawks (28 seasons) and the Boston Bruins (29 seasons) had longer streaks.

This season also marks the last time to date the Pittsburgh Penguins missed the playoffs. From 2007 to present, they have reached the playoffs every year.

Final standings
The Detroit Red Wings won the Presidents' Trophy and home-ice advantage throughout the playoffs.

For ranking in conference, division leaders are automatically ranked 1–3. These three, plus the next five teams in the conference standings, earn playoff berths at the end of the season.

Eastern Conference

Western Conference

Tiebreaking procedures

If two or more clubs are tied in points during the regular season, the standing of the clubs is determined in the following order: 

 The fewer number of games played (i.e., superior points percentage).
 The greater number of games won.
 The greater number of points earned in games between the tied clubs.
 The greater differential between goals for and against.

Playoffs

Bracket

Awards

All-Star teams

Player statistics

Scoring leaders

Note: GP = Games played; G = Goals; A = Assists; Pts = Points; +/- = Plus/minus; PIM = Penalty minutes

Source: NHL.

Leading goaltenders
Minimum 1,000 minutes played.

Note: GP = Games played; Min = Minutes played; W = Wins; L = Losses; OT = Overtime/shootout losses; GA = Goals against; SO = Shutouts; Sv% = Save percentage; GAA = Goals against average

Coaches

Eastern Conference
Atlanta Thrashers: Bob Hartley
Boston Bruins: Mike Sullivan
Buffalo Sabres: Lindy Ruff
Carolina Hurricanes: Peter Laviolette
Florida Panthers: Jacques Martin
Montreal Canadiens: Claude Julien and Bob Gainey
New Jersey Devils: Larry Robinson, Lou Lamoriello and Claude Julien
New York Islanders: Steve Stirling and Brad Shaw
New York Rangers: Tom Renney
Ottawa Senators: Bryan Murray
Philadelphia Flyers: Ken Hitchcock
Pittsburgh Penguins: Michel Therrien
Tampa Bay Lightning: John Tortorella
Toronto Maple Leafs: Pat Quinn
Washington Capitals: Glen Hanlon

Western Conference
Mighty Ducks of Anaheim: Randy Carlyle
Calgary Flames: Darryl Sutter
Chicago Blackhawks: Trent Yawney
Colorado Avalanche: Joel Quenneville
Columbus Blue Jackets: Gerard Gallant and Gary Agnew
Dallas Stars: Dave Tippett
Detroit Red Wings: Mike Babcock
Edmonton Oilers: Craig MacTavish
Los Angeles Kings: Andy Murray and John Torchetti
Minnesota Wild: Jacques Lemaire
Nashville Predators: Barry Trotz
Phoenix Coyotes: Wayne Gretzky
San Jose Sharks: Ron Wilson
St. Louis Blues: Mike Kitchen
Vancouver Canucks: Marc Crawford

Milestones

Debuts
The following are players of note who played their first NHL game in 2005-06:

Alex Burrows, Vancouver Canucks
Dustin Byfuglien, Chicago Blackhawks
Gregory Campbell, Florida Panthers
Jeff Carter, Philadelphia Flyers
Matthew Carle, San Jose Sharks
Sidney Crosby, Pittsburgh Penguins
Ryan Getzlaf, Mighty Ducks of Anaheim 
Mike Green, Washington Capitals
Duncan Keith, Chicago Blackhawks
Andrew Ladd, Carolina Hurricanes
Henrik Lundqvist, New York Rangers
Alexander Ovechkin, Washington Capitals
Zach Parise, New Jersey Devils
Dustin Penner, Mighty Ducks of Anaheim
Corey Perry, Mighty Ducks of Anaheim
Dion Phaneuf, Calgary Flames
Mike Richards, Philadelphia Flyers
Pekka Rinne, Nashville Predators
Alexander Steen, Toronto Maple Leafs
Ryan Suter, Nashville Predators
Maxime Talbot, Pittsburgh Penguins
Thomas Vanek, Buffalo Sabres
Cam Ward, Carolina Hurricanes
Shea Weber, Nashville Predators

Last games

The following is a list of players of note who played their last NHL game in 2005–06, listed with their team:

Tommy Albelin, New Jersey Devils
Dave Andreychuk, Tampa Bay Lightning
Andrew Cassels, Washington Capitals
Eric Daze, Chicago Blackhawks
Eric Desjardins, Philadelphia Flyers
Tie Domi, Toronto Maple Leafs
Brett Hull, Phoenix Coyotes
Alexander Karpovtsev, Florida Panthers
Brian Leetch, Boston Bruins
Mario Lemieux, Pittsburgh Penguins
Alexander Mogilny, New Jersey Devils
Zigmund Palffy, Pittsburgh Penguins
Keith Primeau, Philadelphia Flyers
Luc Robitaille, Los Angeles Kings
Steve Yzerman, Detroit Red Wings
Alexei Zhamnov, Boston Bruins

See also 
 List of Stanley Cup champions
 2005 NHL Entry Draft
 2006 Stanley Cup Playoffs
 2005-06 NHL Transactions
 NHL All-Rookie Team
 Ice hockey at the 2006 Winter Olympics
 2006 Men's World Ice Hockey Championships
 2005 in sports
 2006 in sports

References
 
Notes

External links

2005-06 Depth Charts and Salaries from www.tsn.ca
Hockey Database
NHL.com

 
1
1